Singarva is a census town in Ahmedabad district in the Indian state of Gujarat.

Demographics
 India census, Singarva had a population of 9884. Males constitute 52% of the population and females 48%. Singarva has an average literacy rate of 59%, lower than the national average of 59.5%: male literacy is 69%, and female literacy is 49%. In Singarva, 16% of the population is under 6 years of age.

References

Cities and towns in Ahmedabad district